Tricholoma is a genus of fungus that contains many fairly fleshy white-spored gilled mushrooms which are found worldwide generally growing in woodlands. These are ectomycorrhizal fungi, existing in a symbiotic relationship with various species of coniferous or broad-leaved trees.

The most sought out species are the East Asian Tricholoma matsutake, also known as matsutake or songi, and the North American Tricholoma magnivelare species complex, also known as "ponderosa mushroom", "American matsutake", or "pine mushroom".  Others are safe to eat, such as Tricholoma terreum, but there are a few poisonous members, such as T. pardinum, T. tigrinum and T. equestre.

Many species originally described within Tricholoma have since been moved to other genera. These include the Wood blewit (Clitocybe nuda), previously Tricholoma nudum, blewit (Clitocybe saeva), previously Tricholoma personatum,  and St George's mushroom (Calocybe gambosa) previously Tricholoma gambosum.

Species list

Tricholoma acerbum – bitter knight
Tricholoma aestuans
Tricholoma albobrunneum
Tricholoma album – white knight
Tricholoma argyraceum 
Tricholoma atrosquamosum – dark-scaled knight
Tricholoma auratum – golden Tricholoma
Tricholoma bakamatsutake
Tricholoma batschii
Tricholoma columbetta – dove-coloured Tricholoma 
Tricholoma equestre (previously T. flavovirens) – Man-on-Horseback
Tricholoma focale - booted knight
Tricholoma fracticum
Tricholoma fulvum
Tricholoma huronense
Tricholoma imbricatum – matt knight-cap
Tricholoma inamoenum
Tricholoma magnivelare – pine mushroom, American matsutake
Tricholoma matsutake – matsutake
Tricholoma mesoamericanum – Mexican matsutake, hongo blanco de ocote
Tricholoma murrillianum – Western matsutake
Tricholoma mutabile
Tricholoma myomyces
Tricholoma nigrum
Tricholoma orirubens
Tricholoma pardinum
Tricholoma pessundatum
Tricholoma populinum
Tricholoma portentosum
Tricholoma resplendens
Tricholoma saponaceum – soap-scented toadstool
Tricholoma scalpturatum
Tricholoma sejunctum
Tricholoma squarrulosum
Tricholoma stans - upright knight
Tricholoma stiparophyllum - chemical knight
Tricholoma sulphureum – sulphur Tricholoma, gas agaric
Tricholoma terreum (= T. myomyces) – grey knight-cap
Tricholoma tigrinum
Tricholoma ustale – burnt knight
Tricholoma ustaloides
Tricholoma vaccinum – scaly Tricholoma, scaly knight
Tricholoma venenatum
Tricholoma virgatum – streaked Tricholoma, ashen knight
Tricholoma zangii

See also

List of North American Tricholoma
List of Tricholomataceae genera

References
Footnotes

Citations

Further reading
Marcel Bon : The Mushrooms and Toadstools of Britain and North-western Europe (Hodder & Stoughton 1987).  
Régis Courtecuisse, Bernard Duhem : Guide des champignons de France et d'Europe (Delachaux & Niestlé, 1994-2000).

External links
Mushroom Expert – The Genus Tricholoma
Mykoweb profile of T. magnivelare
MYCOLOGY/bionet.mycology Archives

 
Agaricales genera